
Year 363 BC was a year of the pre-Julian Roman calendar. At the time, it was known as the Year of the Consulship of Aventinensis and Mamercinus (or, less frequently, year 391 Ab urbe condita). The denomination 363 BC for this year has been used since the early medieval period, when the Anno Domini calendar era became the prevalent method in Europe for naming years.

Events
By place
Egypt
 The Egyptian pharaoh Teos (or Tachos) succeeds his father Nectanebo I to the throne. Planning a great attack on Persia, he invites Sparta to help him.

Greece
 The Theban general, Epaminondas, makes a bold attempt to challenge Athens' naval empire. With a new Boeotian fleet, he sails to Byzantium, with the result that a number of cities in the Athenian Empire rebel against their now threatened masters.

Births
 Barsine, mistress of Alexander the Great

Deaths
 Nectanebo I, pharaoh of Egypt
 Marquess Gong of Han, ruler of the State of Han

References